The following table presents a listing of Mexico's 32 federal states, ranked in order of their Human Development Index, as reported by the United Nations Development Programme with data from 1990-2017. As of 2019, only Mexico City and 5 Mexican states have very high human development. The rest of the states, aside from Chiapas, all have high human development.

Mexican States

See also
List of Mexican states by poverty rate
List of Mexican states by unemployment

References

Human Development Index
Mexico
Mexico, HDI
Human Development Index
Society of Mexico